The Mulovsky expedition was a Russian naval expedition planned by Catherine II of Russia, to be led by Captain . The expedition never took place, due to the outbreak of the Russo-Turkish War.

Initial plans

In January 1787, the 22nd year of Catherine II of Russia, two edicts emerged "on the occasion of attempts on the part of English commercial traders to develop trading and commerce in the wildlife of the  Eastern Sea", from the Board of Foreign Affairs and the Board of Admiralty. By the first of these it was ordered that measures be taken “for the maintenance of our right” to the lands discovered by Russians, and by the second, to send four warships from the Baltic Sea by the Cape of Good Hope and Sunda Strait to Kamchatka.

Captain and crew
Captain of the 1st. rank  was appointed commander of this squadron (the number of whose ships was brought up to five) and in his instructions the Admiralty Board set out the problem of the protection of Russian interests in the seas between Kamchatka and America. The expedition was supplied with cast iron escutcheons and specially prepared medals; they were to go with the scientists. It was proposed that the officers keep journals with ethnographical notes and gather collections and compose dictionaries. It was ordered that, after annexing them to Russia, all the Kurile Islands be described, the island of Sakhalin be sailed around and described, that the voyage be continued to Nootka Sound (off Vancouver Island) and that, after investigating that place, the entire coast from "Nootka to the initial point of discovery by Chirikov" be annexed to Russia if it was not already occupied by another power. The expeditions was then to proceed along the coast of Alaska and to "formally to take possession" of it, to destroy foreign armorial bearings and insignia and everywhere establish signs of its belonging to Russia. 

James Trevenen, a British Royal Navy officer and companion of Captain James Cook, was connected with the Mulovsky expedition. In the spring of 1787, Catherine II received his project for developing the fur trade in the Pacific Ocean, which included the dispatch of three ships from Kronstadt by Cape Horn: two would remain on the coast of Kamchatka, the third would take on furs obtained to China or Japan; one or two additional ships yearly would ensure communication with the Baltic, which had to become a very good school for Russian seamen, and ensure supplies for the traders. The project was received by the Empress with enthusiasm, and Trevenen was admitted into the Russian fleet as a captain of the 2nd rank.

Another companion of Cook, the naturalist Georg Forster, was invited to participate in the expedition. He was appointed "historiographer of the fleet", according to the program of the expedition actively drawn up by Peter Simon Pallas.

Cancellation
The World, of 23 November 1787, reported that: 
The squadron, which the Empress of Russia is about to send to Kamschatka, is now ready, and is victualled for three years. It is commanded by Mr. Mulosky, who received his education in England, and afterwards served as a Midshipman in our Navy.
However the Mulovsky expedition was cancelled by Catherine II on 28 October 1787 in connection with the Russo-Turkish War. The next year the Russo-Swedish War began, during which both Mulovsky and Trevenen perished in separate naval battles against the Swedes.

Context
The conception of the Mulovsky expedition and Trevenen’s project anticipated the idea of the 19th century Russian round-the-world and voyages, just as in part it did the scheme of supplying and maintaining commercial communications with Russian America.

See also
First Russian circumnavigation

References

Further reading
 Ал. П. Соколовъ, «Приготовленіе кругосвѣтной экспедиціи 1787 года, подъ начальствомъ Муловскаго», Записки Гидрографического Департамента Морекого Министерства, часть VI, 1848г., стр.142-91. [A.P. Sokolov, The Preparation of the 1787 round-the-world expedition commanded by Mulovsky], Zapiski Gidrogaficheskovo Departamenta Morekovo Ministerstva, part 6, 1848, pp.142-3.
 Г. И. Спасский,  ‘Письмо профессора П. С. Палласа к графу Ивану Григорьевичу Чернышеву’ [G.I. Spassky (ed.), ‘Pismo professora P.S. Pallasa k grafu Ivanu Grigoryevichu Chernyshevu’ (‘A letter from Professor P.S. Pallas to Count Ivan Grigoryevich Chernyshevu’)], Москвитянин, ч.6, no.23, кн.1, [Moskvityanin,pt.6, no.23, bk.1, bound with no.24, bk.2], декабрь, 1849, pp.53-67.
 Лoггин И. Голенишев-Kутузов, Предприятіе Императриціи Экатерински II для путешествіе вокругъ СвеѢта въ 1786 году, Санктпетербургь, 1840 года, (Loggin Ivanovich Golenishchev-Kutuzov, Predpriyatie Imperatritsy Yekaterinsky II dlya puteshestvie vokrug Svieta v 1806 godu, [Empress Catherine II’s Venture of a Voyage Around the World in 1786], Sanktpeterburg, Tipografii Morskago Shliakhetnago Kiadetskago Korpusa,1840.

Exploration of North America
Exploration of North Asia
Catherine the Great